Order of the Medjidie (August 29, 1852 – 1922) is a military and civilian order of the Ottoman Empire. The Order was instituted in 1851 by Sultan Abdulmejid I.

History
Instituted in 1851, the Order was awarded in five classes, with the First Class being the highest. The Order was issued in considerable numbers by Sultan Abdülmecid as a reward for distinguished service to members of the British Army and the Royal Navy and the French Army who came to the aid of the Ottoman Empire during the Crimean War against Russia and to British recipients for later service in Egypt and/or the Sudan. In Britain it was worn after any British gallantry and campaign medals awarded, but, as an Order, before foreign medals like the Turkish Crimean War medal. The Order was usually conferred on officers but a few enlisted soldiers and sailors also received it in a lower class. During World War I it was also awarded to a number of German, Austrian and Bulgarian officers.

The Order was often conferred on non-Turkish nationals.

Design of the Order
On the obverse of the star is Sultan Abdülmecid's royal cipher surrounded by an inscription on a gold-bordered circle of red enamel; all on a star of seven triple quills with small crescents and five-pointed stars between them, suspended from a red enameled crescent and star suspender with green enameled edges.

Rough translation of the front:
To the left: (you have) crossed.
To the right: (you are proven to be) correct.
At the top: (you have provided) protection.
At the bottom: Year 1268.
In the centre: In the name of the God the forgiver, the merciful.

The order has 5 classes. First, second, third and fourth classes are gold. Fifth (lower) class is silver.

Owners of the order:
 First Class Order (Gold) - 50 people (Given by Sultan)
 Second Class Order (Gold) - 150 people (Given by Sultan)
 Third Class Order (Gold) - 800 people
 Fourth Class Order (Gold) - 3,000 people
 Fifth Class Order (Silver) - 6,000 people

Some notable recipients 

 Abdelkader El Djezairi, Algerian Islamic scholar and political and military leader who led a struggle against the French invasion.
 Abraham Ashkenazi, chief rabbi of Palestine
 Mustafa Kemal Atatürk, Ottoman Army officer
 Lucien Baudens, French military surgeon
 Edward Wilmot Blyden, Pan Africanist and Liberian Statesman
 Eugène Chauffeur, French Army officer, from Valence (Drôme), Commandeur of the Legion of Honor, on 6 May 1856. Sous-Lieutenant in the 10th "Bataillon de chasseurs à pied" who sustained a severe wound to the head during the Siege of Sevastopol (Crimea).
 Charles Doughty-Wylie, English army officer who was later killed in the Gallipoli Campaign, ironically in action against Ottoman forces.
 Arthur Conan Doyle, Scottish author
 Richard England, British soldier
 Pierre Louis Charles de Failly, French soldier
 Emanuele Luigi Galizia, Maltese architect and civil engineer
 Rafael de Nogales Méndez, Venezuelan soldier, adventurer and writer.
 George Walter Grabham, British geologist
 George Alfred Henty, English Commissariat Officer and author
 Theodor Herzl, journalist and Zionist leader
 Auguste Lumière, French industrialist and biologist
 Léon-Eugène Méhédin, French architect and photographer
 Helmuth von Moltke the Elder, Prussian Army officer
 Sir William Montgomery-Cuninghame, 9th Baronet, British Army Officer and Victoria Cross recipient
 Napoleon III, Emperor of The French
 Major-General Charles George Gordon, Gordon of Khartoum
 Rear-Admiral Maurice Horatio Nelson, son of Thomas Nelson, 2nd Earl Nelson
 Lord Blyth James Blyth, 1st Baron Blyth, British businessman and politician
 General Sir William Parke, British soldier
 Lord George Paulet, British naval officer
 Pedro II of Brazil, Emperor of Brazil
 Ludomił Rayski, Polish pilot
 Cecil Spring Rice, British diplomat
 Haim Palachi, chief rabbi of Izmir
 Jules Ernest Renoux, French painter
 Pierre-Auguste Sarrus, French musician
 Emanuel Stross, Wholesaler
 Charles Carroll Tevis, American soldier of fortune and Anatolian Cavalry leader
 Alfred Tippinge, British Army officer of the Grenadier Guards, and Legion of Honour recipient
 Maréchal Vaillant
 Carol Davila
 Živojin Mišić, Serbian field marshal and Chef of General Staff
 Louis Pasteur, French chemist and microbiologist
 Yosef Navon, Jerusalem businessman and the man principally responsible for the construction of the Jaffa–Jerusalem railway.
  Field Marshal Sir Frederick Paul Haines GCB GCSI CIE
 Charles Pomeroy Stone, career U.S. Army officer, post Civil War soldier of fortune in Ottoman service.
 Dimitrije Cincar-Marković, Serbian Prime Minister and general
Grocholski Tadeusz
 Perestu Kadın, Valide Sultan of Ottoman Empire
  Princess Victoria Louise of Prussia, Duchess Consort of Brunswick

References

Citations

Bibliography
 The Americana, Vol.15, Ed.  Frederick Converse Beach, George Edwin Rines, 1912.
About Tadeusz Grocholski (in Polish)

External links 

Medjidie
Crimean War
1851 establishments in the Ottoman Empire
Awards established in 1851